Golden Pipeline Heritage Trail (also known as the Golden Pipeline Drive Trail) was a project conducted by the National Trust of Western Australia along the Goldfields Water Supply Scheme pipeline at the time the pipeline was being celebrated for its 100 years of operation.

Project
The project included the creation of guide books, web sites and other materials about the trail.

The project was initiated in the late 1990s; 
further material was developed between 2001 and 2003, and included the Kep Track as part of the project.

Trail and related sites
Some communities along the trail have suffered due to change in agricultural decline, however most communities sustain museums or interpretative signage that give information about the pipeline's history.

As the heritage trail and working pipeline are continuing, considerable effort was expended to maintain and sustain the pipeline trail and its related sites (former pumping stations for example) over time.

The heritage trail achieved status on the Australian national heritage list in 2011.

Trail sections

The Golden Pipeline Heritage Trail is segmented into seven sections:
 Mundaring to Northam
 Northam to Cunderdin
 Cunderdin to Kellerberrin
 Kellerberrin to Merredin
 Merredin to Southern Cross
 Southern Cross to Coolgardie
 Coolgardie to Kalgoorlie

See also
Great Eastern Highway, the road that most of the Golden Pipeline Heritage Trail follows

Notes

References

External links
 The Golden Pipeline Project
  The WA National Trust Website

Historic Civil Engineering Landmarks
Goldfields Water Supply Scheme
Great Western Woodlands
National Trust of Western Australia
Heritage trails in Western Australia

de:Golden Pipeline